

Qualification system
Forty athletes will qualify to compete at the games. The top eight nations (including the host nation, Canada) at the 2014 Pan American Championship, will each receive four athlete quotas in water skiing. A further eight spots are made available for wakeboard qualifiers. A nation may enter a maximum of three athletes in each gender in the water skiing competition.

Qualification timeline

Qualification summary

Water skiing
Eight nations took part at the Pan American Championships, and thus all eight qualify a full team.

Brazil sent one water ski athlete, the remaining slots were reallocated.

Wakeboarding

References

External links
2014 Pan American Water Ski Championship results
2015 Pan American Wakeboard Championship results

Qualification for the 2015 Pan American Games
Water skiing at the 2015 Pan American Games